Charles Stevenson Wright (June 22, 1932 – October 1, 2008) was an American novelist. He wrote the novels The Messenger (1963), The Wig (1966) and Absolutely Nothing to Get Alarmed About (1973).

Early life

Wright was born in New Franklin, Missouri, on June 4, 1932. After the death of his mother, he was sent at the age of four to live with his maternal grandmother, who encouraged a love of reading in him. He dropped out of high school, and his only further education was a brief stint at the Handy Writers' Colony in Marshall, Illinois, taught by James Jones. Afterward he was enlisted in the Army.

Writing career 
In 1955, Wright moved to Manhattan, New York, and worked a number of low-paid jobs while writing his first novel, The Messenger, which was published by Farrar, Straus and Giroux in 1963. His second novel, The Wig, received positive reviews, with Conrad Knickerbocker calling it "brutal, exciting and necessary" in The New York Times. His third and last novel, Absolutely Nothing to Get Alarmed About, sections of which were previously published as essays in The Village Voice, came out in 1973.

In his New York Times column "American Beauties", devoted to undersung American books, Dwight Garner compared reading Wright to "a steep, stinging pleasure", while Ishmael Reed has described Wright as "Richard Pryor before there was a Richard Pryor. Richard Pryor on paper." Reed contributed an introduction to The Collected Novels of Charles Wright (Harper Perennial, 2019).

Bibliography

The Messenger (1963)
The Wig (1966)
Absolutely Nothing to Get Alarmed About (1973)
Absolutely Nothing to Get Alarmed About: The Complete Novels of Charles Wright (1993)

References 

1932 births
2008 deaths
20th-century African-American writers
20th-century American male writers
20th-century American novelists
21st-century African-American people
African-American male writers
African-American novelists
American male novelists
Novelists from Missouri
People from Howard County, Missouri
United States Army soldiers